Peter Rawson Taft (April 14, 1785 – January 1, 1867) was an American politician. He was President William Howard Taft's paternal grandfather.

Early life and family
Peter was born to Aaron Taft and Rhoda Rawson on April 14, 1785 at Uxbridge in Worcester County, Massachusetts. The Aaron Taft House in Uxbridge is now listed on the National Register of Historic Places.  Aaron was a farmer, first in Uxbridge and then later in Townshend, Vermont. Aaron Taft (1743–1808), Peter Rawson Taft's father, in turn, was the son of Peter Taft. Peter was the grandson of Robert Taft Sr. (1640-1725), the first Taft who immigrated to America and settled at Mendon and Uxbridge,  Massachusetts. Peter Rawson Taft was then the 5th generation descendant of the first Taft in America, Robert Taft Sr. Uxbridge and Mendon were the birthplace of the famous American Taft family. Rhoda Rawson, the mother of Peter Rawson Taft, was a descendant of Edward Rawson, who came from England to New England in 1636, and was for thirty-five years secretary of the Massachusetts Bay Colony. Aaron Taft, the father of Peter Rawson Taft, was educated at Princeton College. Meeting with severe losses in Massachusetts, he took his family to Vermont around 1800, when Peter Rawson Taft was about 15 years of age. Peter Rawson Taft was reared a farmer, with a common-school education in Uxbridge and Townshend. A Taft family story tells of Peter Rawson Taft leading a cow all the way from Uxbridge to Townshend, Vermont when the family moved.

Marriage and first child
Peter Rawson Taft married Sylvia Howard of Townshend, Vermont, Windham County, Vermont. She was the daughter of Levi Howard, and Bethiah Chapin of Townshend around 1810 in Townshend. Their first son was Alphonso Taft, born on November 5, 1810 at Townshend.

Career as a lawyer and legislator
He was a man of intellectual tastes and capacity, and educated himself after leaving school, so that he subsequently was admitted to the bar and practiced law. He served many years in the Vermont House of Representatives, and was judge of the Probate and County Courts of Windham County, Vermont. Peter Rawson Taft I's son, Alphonso, was born in Townshend, Vermont. Peter Rawson Taft I, later moved with his family to Cincinnati, and the Taft Family grew to be a political dynasty in Cincinnati and Hamilton County as well as the State of Ohio, and the United States.

Afterward
Peter's son, Alphonso Taft (1810–1891), became the U.S. Secretary of War (1876), and U.S. Attorney General (1876–1877). Alphonso Taft founded Skull and Bones at Yale. Peter Rawson Taft died at age 81 in Cincinnati, Ohio. Peter's grandson, William Howard Taft became the President of the United States from 1909-1913. He was also the only President to serve as Chief Justice of the United States. The Taft family continued the tradition of returning to Uxbridge for family reunions. Another grandson was Charles Phelps Taft, a newspaperman in Cincinnati who became the first owner of the Chicago Cubs.

Notes

1785 births
1867 deaths
Taft family
American people of English descent
People from Uxbridge, Massachusetts
Politicians from Cincinnati
People from Windham County, Vermont
Members of the Vermont House of Representatives
Vermont lawyers
Ohio lawyers
19th-century American politicians
Lawyers from Cincinnati
19th-century American lawyers